DeeJay TV is an Italian general-entertainment channel, opened in 2002 as a music satellite channel, and re-launched in 2009 on digital terrestrial television.

See also
 Radio DeeJay

Music television channels
Television channels in Italy
GEDI Gruppo Editoriale
Italian-language television stations
Television channels and stations established in 2002
2002 establishments in Italy
Music organisations based in Italy